Oscar Carrillo (November 22, 1921 - January 21, 2003) was born in Hebbronville, Texas in Jim Hogg County to David Carrillo (D.C. Chapa) and Emma Pena Carrillo Chapa. Carrillo graduated from Benavides High School and married Evangelina Garcia on March 23, 1941. Together they had ten children. Carrillo was a veteran of the U.S. Army in the second World War and was awarded a Bronze Star for his service. In 1947, at age 21, Carrillo became the youngest Mayor of the City of Benavides. Carrillo was elected as county attorney in 1960 and served for 10 years. Carillo served three terms as state representative of the 48th district from 1967 and 1973. He is remembered for his role in convincing Texas legislators to approve the Conally-Carrillo Act, which allowed thousands of Texans and low-income students to attend college area universities and is also credited with co-authoring legislation creating the University of Texas at San Antonio. The University of Texas at San Antonio conferred on him the degree of doctor of political science and doctor of laws.

References
Burka, Paul. Texas Monthly: the National Magazine of Texas. Web. 10 September 2010. <http://www.texasmonthly.com/preview/1987-12-01/feature>.
Hill, John L., and Ernie Stromberger. John Hill for the State of Texas: My Years as Attorney General. College Station: Texas A&M UP, 2008. Print.
Hoppe, By Christy. "Rep. Lon Burnam Calls for Vote on Whether to Impeach Court of Criminal Appeals Justice Sharon Keller | News for Dallas, Texas | Dallas Morning News | Texas Regional News." Dallas News, Sports, Weather and Traffic from The Dallas Morning News. Web. 11 September 2010. <http://www.dallasnews.com/sharedcontent/dws/news/texassouthwest/stories/DN-keller_28tex.ART.State.Edition1.4a626c7.html>.
Pearson, Spencer. "Career of Carrillo Goes on the Line Wednesday in Austin." Corpus Christi Caller [Corpus Christi] Aug.-Sept. 1975: 1c-2c. Print.
Schmal, John P. The Journey to Latino Political Representation. Westminster, MD: Heritage, 2007. Print.

1921 births
2003 deaths
Mayors of places in Texas
Members of the Texas House of Representatives
University of Texas at San Antonio
Hispanic and Latino American state legislators in Texas
Hispanic and Latino American mayors in Texas
People from Jim Hogg County, Texas
People from Duval County, Texas
United States Army personnel of World War II
20th-century American politicians
Military personnel from Texas